The 2010 Canada Cup Floorball Championship was the seventh such championship contested in the tournament's history. The tournament took place from May 21 to May 23, 2010 at York University in Toronto, Ontario, Canada.

The tournament saw its first Ontario-based club win the elite division, as the Salming Vikings defeated the Ottawa Blizzard 9:2 in the championship match to capture the gold medal.

A record 57 clubs participated in the competition. In addition to that, the first youth clubs from abroad captured respective division championships as well, as Sweden's Skogsäng Cobras captured the high school title and Salem Panthers IF won the bantam division.

The tournament also saw the first clubs win multiple divisions. The Mississauga Red Devils captured both the recreational and atom/peewee crowns, and came close to capturing the bantam division with an impressive second-place finish. Although they participated under different names, the two Swedish teams belonged to the same club, capturing both the high school and bantam titles.

Source for Sports also returned as the tournament's headline sponsor, and 4 Finnish referees from the Salibandyliiga and the International Floorball Federation (IFF) were also on hand to officiate matches.

Elite Division results

Group A: Salming Conference
To sort this table by any column, click on the  icon next to the column title.

May 21, 2010

May 22, 2010

Group B: X3M Conference
To sort this table by any column, click on the  icon next to the column title.

May 21, 2010

May 22, 2010

Playoffs
At this point in the competition, the clubs play in a cross-division playoff round, where the top club in one conference plays the weakest club in the other conference, the second placed club plays the third, and so on.

Draws between clubs were settled by points, wins, head-to-head match-ups, goal differential, goals against, goals for, and finally a coin toss.

Bracket

Quarterfinals

Semifinals

Bronze medal match

Gold medal match

Statistics and awards

Standings
Official Standings:

Awards
To sort this table by any column, click on the  icon next to the column title.

Other divisions
In addition to the elite division, 6 other divisions were contested:

Intermediate

Ladies
Although accurate scoring summaries are not available, Darkside FC defeated Minneapolis 612 in the Ladies final for the gold medal, and Girls with Balls defeated the Ottawa Blizzard for bronze.

Recreational

High school

Bantam

Atom/Peewee

See also
Canada Cup (floorball)
List of Canada Cup winners

External links
Official Canada Cup Website

|-style="text-align: center; background: #ffa07a;"
|align="center" colspan="3"|Canada Cup Floorball Championship

Canada Cup (Floorball), 2010
Floorball competitions
Floorball in Canada
Canada Cup